Adéyẹyè is a surname  of Yoruba origin meaning "the crown or royalty befits chieftaincy". Notable people with the surname include:
Olusola Adeyeye, Nigerian biologist and politician
Prince Adedayo Clement Adeyeye, Nigerian politician
Festus Adeyeye 
Modupe Adeyeye, English actress